Cadwallon ap Ieuaf (died 986) was a King of Gwynedd.

Cadwallon was the son of Ieuaf ab Idwal and succeeded to the throne of Gwynedd on the death of his brother Hywel ab Ieuaf in 985. He only reigned for a year, for in 986 Maredudd ab Owain of Deheubarth invaded Gwynedd, slew Cadwallon and annexed his kingdom.

References

Cadwallon ab Ieuaf, Prince of Gwynedd
Monarchs of Gwynedd
10th-century Welsh monarchs
Year of birth unknown